USS Osprey II (SP-928) was a United States Navy patrol vessel in commission from 1917 to 1918.

Osprey II was built as a private motorboat of the same name by Williams-Whittlesey Co. in New York City. On 10 August 1917, the U.S. Navy acquired her from her owner, C. R. Runyon, for use as a section patrol boat during World War I. She was commissioned as USS Osprey II (SP-928) on 5 November 1917.

Assigned to the 3rd Naval District Osprey II operated on patrol duties in the Marine Basin and New York Harbor.

In July 1918, Osprey II was deemed to have proven unsuitable for naval use. Decommissioned at the shipyard of the Charles L. Seabury Company at Morris Heights in the Bronx, New York, she was returned to Runyon on 26 December 1918.

References

Department of the Navy Naval History and Heritage Command Online Library of Selected Images: U.S. Navy Ships: USS Osprey II (SP-928), 1917-1918. Originally the civilian pleasure boat Osprey II
NavSource Online: Section Patrol Craft Photo Archive Osprey II (SP 928)

Patrol vessels of the United States Navy
World War I patrol vessels of the United States
Ships built in New York City